

Top scorers by season

References 

Ghana
Ghana Premier League